The 1992–93 Southern Jaguars basketball team represented Southern University during the 1992–93 NCAA Division I men's basketball season. The Jaguars, led by head coach Ben Jobe, played their home games at the F. G. Clark Center and were members of the Southwestern Athletic Conference. They finished the season 21–10, 9–5 in SWAC play to finish in a tie for second place. They were champions of the SWAC tournament to earn an automatic bid to the 1993 NCAA tournament where they upset ACC Tournament champion and No. 4 seed Georgia Tech in the opening round. The Jaguars lost in the second round to No. 12 seed George Washington, 90–80.

Roster

Schedule

|-
!colspan=9 style=| Regular season

|-
!colspan=9 style=| 1993 SWAC tournament

|-
!colspan=9 style=|1993 NCAA tournament

Players in the 1993 NBA draft

References

Southern Jaguars basketball seasons
Southern
Southern
South
South